María Daniela y su Sonido Lasser is a Mexican electronic group. It consists of the electronic guru Emilio Acevedo and the singer María Daniela Azpiazu. They are one of the most popular projects of the well-known Mexican electronic label Nuevos Ricos.

Biography 

In 2007, Emilio Acevedo, already working in other electronic projects such as Titán, started Sonido Lasser Drakar. Exploring the sounds of dance music, he asked a friend, Maria Daniela, to join the group just for fun. In 2003 they released a cover of Aerolíneas Federales "No me beses en los labios", then created the song "Super Vacaciones" (Super vacations) that was part of the soundtrack of the film "Coapa Heights" by Gibran Asuad.

The duo recorded the song "Miedo", which came from an electrocumbia sampler from Sonido Lasser Drakar, and soon started gaining success in the club scene, both in Mexico and worldwide. They began performing as a duo. They joined the "World Domination Tour" of Nuevos Ricos throughout Europe and United States, and in 2005, they released their first LP "María Daniela y su Sonido Lasser".

María Daniela y su Sonido Lasser like to define their music as Electro Pop for Dance Halls and they hope their sound will invigorate the current Mexican High Energy scene.

They're also famous for the songs "Fiesta de Cumpleaños", "El Tuviera No Existe", "Chicle De Menta", "Pobre Estupida", and "Mentiras", cover of Mexican pop icon Daniela Romo.

They created the theme song for the latest Televisa's reality show, El Bar Provoca.

Their second album "Juventud En Extasis" was released in December 2007. Their third album was released on November 2010, it is title "Baila Duro".

Album track lists

Maria Daniela y su Sonido Lasser
A Bailar
Fiesta de Cumpleaños
Mi Primera Vez
Beam Laden
Mentiras
Miedo 2005
Abismo
Yo no Soy Asi
El tuviera no Existe
A Media Noche
Miedo
Track 12
Yo no soy asi V2
Carita de Angel (bonus track)
Chicle de menta (bonus track)
Yo no soy una gori! (bonus track)

Juventud En Éxtasis
Pecadora Normal
Pobre Estúpida
Asesiné A Mi Novio
Tu Sombra
Es Mejor Así
Qué Vas A Hacer
Dame Más
Pinta Un Bosque
Amor Fugaz
100 X Hora
Duri Duri
Silencio (Juventud en Extasis)
Drop The Chalupa (bonus track)

Baila Duro
1000000 De Besos
Baila Duro
Garras De Tigre
No Te Aguanto Mas
Soñando Despierta
Yo Tenia Un Novio

Vol.Súbele
Muéveme
Soy el Hit
Que Triste
Autos Cósmicos
Cielo Rojo
Contigo Me Mecía
Party Rider
Marimar
Teléfono
Modern Chimes
Zombie 2000

External links 
Facebook page
Nuevos Ricos

Hi-NRG groups
Mexican electronic musical groups
Mexican pop music groups